The 1986 MLB Japan All-Star Series was the first edition of the championship, a best-of-seven series between the All-Star teams from Major League Baseball (MLB) and Nippon Professional Baseball (NPB), then-called All-Japan.

MLB won the series by 6–1–0 and Tony Peña was named MVP.

Results

Championship

Rosters

MLB All-Stars roster

NPB All-Stars (All-Japan) roster

References

MLB Japan All-Star Series
1986 in baseball
1986 in Japanese sport